The Indiana State Sycamores basketball team is an NCAA Division I women's basketball program of Indiana State University in Terre Haute, Indiana. The Sycamores compete in the Missouri Valley Conference.

Sycamore basketball history 
In 1971, women's basketball became an intercollegiate sport at Indiana State University. In 1982, the sport was elevated to revenue status, which meant more money was available. Under Coach Edith Godleski, Indiana State qualified for its first WNIT Tournament game in 1976. The Sycamores were a charter member of the Gateway Conference in 1983, maintaining membership until the Gateway merged with the Missouri Valley Conference in 1992. In 1989, Indiana State won its first regular season championship. They won Missouri Valley titles in 2003 and 2006, though they failed to win the tournament title.

Season-by-season results

Postseason history
Indiana State basketball is rich in history, with 17 post-season appearances (6 WNIT appearances, 5 MAIAW Regional appearances and 6 IAIAW appearances), though no NCAA Tournament appearances. They have won three Missouri Valley Conference regular season titles and 1 Gateway Conference title. Prior to joining the NCAA, they won three Indiana Association for Intercollegiate Athletics for Women titles and four in-season Tournament titles.

Women's National Invitation Tournament
Indiana State has appeared in the Women's National Invitation Tournament six times. They have a record of 2-6.

AIAW appearances
Indiana State made one appearance in the AIAW women's basketball tournament. They had a record of 0-1.

National Women’s Invitation Tournament
Indiana State made one appearance in the National Women's Invitational Tournament. They had a record of 0-2.

Rivalries
The Sycamores share a classic rivalry with the Ball State Cardinals, of which State owns a 21–8 series lead. The Sycamores also own an 11–9 series lead over the Purdue Boilermakers, a perennial, national power.

Retired Numbers
Two Sycamore players have had their numbers retired by the school. Amy Hile is the latest, with her number 15 retired by the school on February 19, 2022.

National awards

All-Americans (1) 

 Melanie Boeglin (2006) – 3rd Team, Full Court Press, the Associated Press, The Sports Network and WBCA.

CoSIDA Academic All-Americans (6) 

 Amy Hile (1987)
 Melanie Boeglin (2006)
 Laura Rudolphi (2007, 2008)
 Kelsey Luna (2009, 2010)

NCAA Postgraduate Scholarship (1) 

 Kelsey Luna (2010)

WBCA's National Team GPA Award (3) 

 2003, 2005, 2009

Conference (Missouri Valley / Gateway) Awards

Jackie Stiles Missouri Valley Player of the Year (1) 

 Melanie Boeglin (2006)

MVC Defensive Player of the Year (2) 

 Amy Amstutz (1999)
 Melanie Boeglin (2005)

MVC Prairie Farms Scholar-Athlete of the Year (4) 

 Kourtney Mennen (2003)
 Melanie Boeglin (2006)
 Laura Rudolphi (2007)
 Kelsey Luna (2009)

MVC Freshman of the Year (2) 

 Stephanie Lisch (2004)
 Kelsey Luna (2007)

MVC Newcomer of the Year (2) 

 Amy Amstutz (1997)
 Ashley Clark (2005)

Rawlings MVC Coach of the Year (2) 

 Jim Wiedie (2003, 2006)

Gateway Rookie of the Year (2) 

 Amy Hile (1984)
 Hazel Olden (1991)

Gateway Coach of the Year(1) 

 Andi Myers (1988)

All-time records

Career records 

 Most Points: Amy Hile – 1,944 (1983–87)
 Most Rebounds: Amy Hile – 916 (1983–87)
 Most Assists: Melanie Boeglin – 685 (2002–06) Missouri Valley record
 Most Steals: Melanie Boeglin – 444 (2002–06) Missouri Valley record
 Most Blocks: Laura Rudolphi – 154 (2004–08)
 Most 3-Point Field Goals: Kelsey Luna – 258 (2006–2010) # 5 Missouri Valley Conference

Single season records 

 Most Points: Melanie Boeglin – 600 (2005–06)
 Most Rebounds: Georgia Bottoms – 286 (1994–95)
 Most Assists: Melanie Boeglin – 217 (2005–06)
 Most Steals: Melanie Boeglin – 123 (2004–05)
 Most Blocks: Laura Rudolphi – 52 (2007–08)
 Most 3-Point Field Goals: Kourtney Mennen – 82 (2002–03)

Single game records 

 Most Points: Melanie Boeglin – 46 (2006)
 Most Rebounds: Amy Hile – 22 (1984)
 Most Assists: Melanie Boeglin – 19 (2005) Missouri Valley record
 Most 3-Point Field Goals: 5 players – 7 (most recent 2006)

Coaching leaders

Basketball Hall(s) of Fame 

Hall of Fame Sycamores

Indiana Basketball Hall of Fame (11) 

 Jan Conner – 2002 (Player, 1970-1974)
 Dru (Cox) Pearcy – 2004 (Player, 1977-1981)
 Chanda Kline – 2004 (Player, 1978-1982)
 Florida Lowry – 2004 (Player, 1947-1951)
 Rochelle Newell – 2004 (Player, 1976-1980)
 Barbara Jean Graves – 2005 (Player, 1979-1983)
 Cheryl (Endicott) Weatherman – 2005 (Player, 1960-1964)
 Jeannie Butler – 2006 (Player, 1953-1957)
 Betty Lou Clark – 2008 (Player, 1970-1974)
 Cindy (Beesley) Aguirre - 2011 (Player, 1978-1982)
 Dru Lisman - 2011 (Player, 1969-1973)
 Amy Hile – 2012 (Player, 1983-1987)
 Teri Moren – 2012 (Head Coach, 2010–2014)

Indiana State University Hall of Fame (7) 

 Ann Reifel – 1985
 Maybelle Steeg Lammers – 1999
 Jan Conner – 2000
 Barbara Graves – 2002
 Amy Hile – 2005
 Patricia Porter – 2007
 Amy Armstutz – 2009
 Edith Godleski – 2009

References 

https://web.archive.org/web/20110711114309/http://www.gosycamores.com/ViewArticle.dbml?DB_OEM_ID=15200&KEY=&ATCLID=3643911&SPID=7260&SPSID=65162

External links